Bjørn Johansen may refer to:

 Bjørn Johansen (footballer) (born 1969), former Norwegian footballer
 Bjørn Johansen (ice hockey) (born 1944), Norwegian ice hockey player
 Bjørn Johansen (musician) (1940–2002), Norwegian jazz musician

See also
Bjorn Johansson (disambiguation)